The Leeds City Council election took place on 1 May 2003 to elect members of City of Leeds Metropolitan Borough Council in West Yorkshire, England. One third of the council was up for election and the Labour party stayed in overall control of the council.

Election result
The results saw Labour just keep a majority on the council with 52 of the 99 seats. They suffered a net loss of 5 seats, including the leader of the council for the past 7 years, Brian Walker, who was defeated by the Liberal Democrats in Rothwell ward. The Conservatives gained the most seats to become the second largest party on the council with 22 seats, after making 4 gains in Aireborough, Halton, Otley and Wharfedale and Roundhay wards. As well as the gain in Rothwell, the Liberal Democrats also picked up a seat from Labour in Burmantofts but lost seats in Bramley and Otley and Wharfedale to Labour and Conservatives respectively.

Elsewhere independent Tom Leadley gained a seat from Labour in Morley North, while the Greens held their seat in Wortley. Turnout in the election dropped to just over 30% with some wards seeing under 20% voting, while the lowest turnout came in Headingley at only 15%.

Following the election the deputy leader of the council, Keith Wakefield, became leader unopposed after a meeting of the Labour group on the council.

This result had the following consequences for the total number of seats on the council after the elections:

Ward results

References

2003 English local elections
2003
2000s in Leeds